Gemmula waihaoensis is an extinct species of sea snail, a marine gastropod mollusk in the family Turridae, the turrids.

Description

Distribution
Fossils of this marine species have been found in Tertiary strata in New Zealand.

References

 Suter, H. 1917. Descriptions of new Tertiary Mollusca occurring in New Zealand, accompanied by a few notes on necessary changes in nomenclature. New Zealand Geological Survey Paleontological Bulletin 5:vi + 93 pp., 13 pls.
 Maxwell, P.A. (2009). Cenozoic Mollusca. pp 232–254 in Gordon, D.P. (ed.) New Zealand inventory of biodiversity. Volume one. Kingdom Animalia: Radiata, Lophotrochozoa, Deuterostomia. Canterbury University Press, Christchurch

waihaoensis
Gastropods described in 1924
Gastropods of New Zealand